Gay Kristine Jacobsen D'Asaro (now Gay MacLellan)  is an American Olympic foil fencer.

She attended the University of California, Santa Barbara from 1972 to 1974 and fenced as a member of the UC Santa Barbara Gauchos.  She later transferred and fenced for San Jose State University in late the 1970s and early 1980s. She holds a record for two National Titles, and was a 1-rated Referee. She was inducted into the USFA Hall of Fame in 2004.  As a child, she lived in Ripon, California, and later, lived in Ashland, Oregon, where she taught private fencing lessons.  She was a student of coach Michael D'Asaro Sr., whom she later married.  As of 2006, she no longer uses last name D'Asaro, and now goes by her married name:  Gay (Jacobsen) MacLellan.

Accomplishments
 1973 "Under 20" National Champion
 1973 World Championships
 1974 U.S. Women's Foil National Champion
 1975 NIWFA Pan American Team Member
 1976 U.S. Olympic Team Foil Fencer
 1978 U.S. Women's Foil National Champion
 1979 NIWFA Pan American Team Member (won Bronze medal)
 1980 U.S. Olympic Team Foil Fencer
 Because of Jimmy Carter's ban on the 1980 Moscow Summer Olympic Games, D'Asaro and the rest of her Olympic Fencing team did not compete in the games. She was one of 461 athletes to receive a Congressional Gold Medal instead.

Honors
 UC Santa Barbara Hall of Fame (Fencing 1972–74)
 2001-2005 Appointed to USFA Fencing Officials Commission
 2002 Olympian Procession at Oregon Sports Authority
 2004 Inducted into United States Fencing Association Hall of Fame

Academic work
 A History of the Amateur Fencers League of America.  D'Asaro, G.K.J. 1983. A history of the Amateur Fencers League of America. Unpublished thesis, Ph.D. dissertation.   (U860 .D37, San Jose State University)

See also
 List of American foil fencers
 USFA

References

External links
 Pan American Games Results
 USFA Hall of Fame Listing

1954 births
Living people
American female foil fencers
UC Santa Barbara Gauchos fencers
San Jose State Spartans fencers
Olympic fencers of the United States
Fencers at the 1976 Summer Olympics
Sportspeople from Ashland, Oregon
Pan American Games bronze medalists for the United States
Pan American Games medalists in fencing
Congressional Gold Medal recipients
Fencers at the 1979 Pan American Games
21st-century American women
Medalists at the 1979 Pan American Games